Barry White Sings for Someone You Love is the self-produced seventh album by soul singer Barry White, released in 1977 on the 20th Century label.

Commercial performance
The album topped the R&B albums chart, White's first to do so since 1975. It also reached No. 8 on the Billboard 200, his second to reach the top ten. The album was a success, yielding two Billboard R&B Top Ten singles, "It's Ecstasy When You Lay Down Next to Me", which peaked at No. 1, and "Playing Your Game, Baby". "It's Ecstasy When You Lay Down Next to Me" was also a hit on the Billboard Hot 100, reaching #4. A third single, "Oh, What a Night for Dancing", reached No. 13 on the R&B chart and No. 24 on the pop chart. The album was digitally remastered and reissued on CD on September 24, 1996, by Mercury Records. The original vinyl album was released with three different covers. In addition to the beige fur with black letters cover shown above, the LP was also issued with dark brown fur and grey fur. Each of these covers had White's name and the album's title in white letters, and are harder to find than the more common light brown fur with black letters cover.

"Playing Your Game, Baby", the first track featured on the album, was remixed by British electronica group Groove Armada for their 2000 album Back to Mine: Groove Armada.

Track listing

Personnel
Barry White - lead vocals, arranger
John Roberts - orchestration 
Technical
Frank Kejmar - engineer
Grant Edwards - front cover photography

Charts

Singles

Certifications and sales

See also
List of number-one R&B albums of 1977 (U.S.)

References

External links
 'Barry White Sings for Someone You Love' at Discogs

1977 albums
Barry White albums
20th Century Fox Records albums